The CN Centre is a 5,971-seat multi-purpose arena, in Prince George, British Columbia, Canada. It was designed by PBK Architects, opened in 1995 and is owned by the City of Prince George.  There are 14 luxury suites.  In 2005, Canadian National Railway purchased the naming rights to the building (initially known as the Multiplex).

The CN Centre is northern British Columbia's premier sports and entertainment venue, and has hosted many internationally renowned acts and entertainment.  Such performers have included: KISS, Avril Lavigne,  Elton John, the Blue Man Group, Mötley Crüe, Nickelback, ZZ Top, Sarah McLachlan, Willie Nelson, Jason Aldean, Shania Twain, Bonnie Raitt, and Brooks and Dunn.  Besides concerts, the CN Centre has hosted: the 2022 World Women's Curling Championship, Cirque du Soleil, David Copperfield, Ringling Brothers & Barnum and Bailey Circus, mixed martial art events, monster trucks, rodeos, and various ice skating shows.

It is home to the Prince George Cougars ice hockey team of the Western Hockey League. And in 2010, for one season, the CN Centre was the home of the Prince George Fury, of the Canadian Indoor Soccer League.

The CN Centre has a 200 ft. x 85 ft. ice surface, and is able to convert to an Olympic-sized ice surface of 200 ft. x 100 ft.

The CN Centre links with the three Kincentre arenas, creating a multi-functional four arena complex.

TicketsNorth is the official ticket supplier of CN Centre events.

In 2015, the CN Centre played an integral role as Prince George hosted the 2015 Canada Winter Games.

References

External links
CN Centre

Indoor arenas in British Columbia
Indoor ice hockey venues in British Columbia
Sports venues in British Columbia
Western Hockey League arenas
Buildings and structures in Prince George, British Columbia
Sport in Prince George, British Columbia
Canadian National Railway